The Academics for Peace (BAK) refers to an association of academics who support a peaceful solution to the Kurdish Turkish conflict. They were established in November 2012 and their first public appearance was in support of hunger strikers in Turkish prisons.

History 
In November 2012 about 10,000 prisoners were in a hunger strike and had three demands. They wanted to be able to defend themselves in Kurdish language while on trial, the improvement of Abdullah Öcalan's detention conditions, and the start of peace negotiations between Turkey and the Kurdistan Workers' Party (PKK). A group of academics discussed their demands in a meeting and subsequently they prepared a petition in support of the hunger strikers. Eventually, more than 200 academics from over 50 universities signed the petition in support of the prisoners' demands. Then, since negotiations between Öcalan and politicians of the Peoples' Democratic Party (HDP) were initiated in January 2013, the Academics for Peace actively informed about it. After the peace process was terminated and the conflict gained force the BAK signed a second petition called "We will be not a party to this crime!". The petition was directed against the human rights violations in cities like Nusaybin, Cizre and Diyarbakır and demanded the reactivation of the peace process. The BAK organized press conferences in Ankara and Istanbul on 11 January 2016, during which they read out their demands. The petition was initially signed by over a thousand academics from more than 80 universities. The Academics for Peace encouraged academics from foreign countries to sign the petition as well and over 300 academics, amongst which figured prominent academics like the feminist Judith Butler and the linguist Noam Chomsky, signed the petition.

Reaction to the petition "We will be not a party to this crime!" 

The academics were supported by Human Rights Watch, the US Ambassador to Turkey John Bass, and other NGOs. But the Turkish Government of Recep Tayyip Erdogan began a campaign against the Academics for Peace, with Erdogan accusing them of being terrorists themselves.  Nationalist students called for the dismissal of the Academics for Peace from their universities, and the prominent Turkish criminal Sedat Peker published an article directed at the academics on his website in which it was stated ‘‘We will shed your blood and swim in it!”. Peker had to stand trial for the threat but was acquitted. Devlet Bahçeli, the leader of the Nationalist Movement Party (MHP) made a statement accusing the Academics for Peace of treason, while several signatories received threats over anonymous messages and had their universities offices marked red. Hundreds of signatories had to resign or were dismissed from the universities where they worked.

Legal prosecution 
The Turkish Government ordered the detention and arrest of dozens of signatories of the second petition and accused them of propaganda for a terrorist organization. Against all of the over 1000 signatories investigations were opened. Over 600 signatories were charged, mostly under Article No. 7.2 of the Anti-Terror Law or Article 301 of the penal code of the Turkish Republic. In most trials which ended in a verdict, the defendants were found guilty of the offences and sentenced them to prison sentences between 15 months and 3 years. The majority of the sentences were suspended but against 36 academics not. 29 verdicts were not suspended as the prison term in question was above 2 years and against the others it was not suspended as the defendants did want a suspension of the verdict. In July 2019, the Constitutional Court of Turkey ruled that the rights of expression of the signatories of the petition were violated and in September 2019 a Turkish court for the first time acquitted one of the Academics for Peace. In the following months several trials ended with an acquittal. 171 academics for peace were found innocent by 17 separate courts as of September 2019. As of 30 October 2020, 204 academics were sentenced to a prison term higher than one year. While most verdicts were appealable, thirty-six academics are in prison, either because their verdict amounts to over two years or the academics did not accept the deferral of the verdict.

Awards 

 2016 MESA Academic Freedom Award of the Middle Eastern Studies Association
 2018, Courage to Think Defender Award of the Scholars at Risk
Aachen 2016 – Peace Prize
Johann-Philipp-Palm 2016 – Award for Freedom of Press and Expression
Middle East Studies Association 2016 – Award for Academic Freedom
Diyarbakır Medical Chamber 2016 – Prize for Peace and Democracy
Human Rights Association 2016 – Ayşe Nur Zarakolu Award for Freedom of Thought and Expression
Hrant Dink 2016 – Inspirations Award
Halkevleri 2016 – Solidarity Award
Social Democracy Foundation 2016 – Prize for Human Rights, Democracy, Peace and Solidarity
İstanbul Medical Chamber 2017-Sevinç Özgüner Award for Human Rights, Peace and Democracy
Scholars at Risk Network 2018 – Courage to Think Defender Award
Suruç Families’ Initiative 2019 – Award for Justice and Resistance

References

External links 

 Scholars at Risk Peace Petition Scholars, Turkey
 Inside Higher Ed: Peace Petition Signatories Face Continued Prosecutions

Modern history of Turkey
Human rights in Turkey
Peace movements
Human rights in Kurdistan